The Festival Paris Cinéma is one of the most recent French movie festivals, started in 2003. It is held annually in July. It was launched in 2003 after the municipal government withdrew funding for Festival du Film de Paris.

2003 Edition
 Tribute to Terry Gilliam 
 Eliseo Subiela retrospective
 Post Cannes: "Shara" (Naomi Kawase), "Uzak" (Nuri Bilge Ceylan), "Les Egares" (Andre Techine)
 "Qui a tué Bambi?", directed by Gilles Marchand
 Michelangelo Antonioni retrospective
 Tribute to Leslie Cheung
 Docus Dements: "Lost in La Mancha" (Fulton/Pepe), "Comandante" (Oliver Stone), "Soy Cuba" (Mikhail Kalatozov)

Films in Competition 2005
 À travers la forêt, directed by Jean-Paul Civeyrac
 Adam & Paul, directed by Lenny Abrahamson
 And Thereafter, directed by Hosup Lee
 Beautiful City (Shahre Ziba), directed by Asghar Farhadi
 El Perro negro (Histoires de la guerre civile espagnole), directed by Péter Forgács
 Home Sweet Home, directed by Nils De Coster
 How the Garcia Girls Spent their Summer, directed by Georgina Garcia Riedel
 Odessa Odessa..., directed by Michale Boganim
 Pour les vivants et les morts (Eläville ja kuolleille), directed by Kari Paljakka
 Pour un seul de mes deux yeux (Nekam achat mishtey eynay), directed by Avi Mograbi
 Le Rivage des murmures (A costa dos murmurios), directed by Margarida Cardoso
 Ronde de nuit (Ronda nocturna), directed by Edgardo Cozarinsky
 Silenzio, directed by Christian Merlhiot
 Le Soleil (Solnze), directed by Alexander Sokurov
 The Night is Bright, directed by Roman Balayan
 This Charming Girl (Yeoja, Jeong-hae), directed by Lee Yoon-ki
 Un silenzio particolare, directed by Stefano Rulli
 Voici venu le temps, directed by Alain Guiraudie
 Watermarks directed by Yaron Zilberman
 Yesterday, directed by Darrell James Roodt

References

External links

Official site Festival Paris cinéma

Film festivals in Paris
Recurring events established in 2003